The 2022 Men's Euro Hockey League was the 15th season of the Euro Hockey League, Europe's men's premier club field hockey tournament, organized by the European Hockey Federation.

It took place alongside the women's tournament at the Wagener Stadium in Amstelveen, Netherlands from 13 to 18 April 2022. Due to the delayed 2021 edition of the Euro Hockey League, only 12 teams participated in this edition. The remaining eight teams played in the 2022 Euro Hockey League Ranking Cup.

Bloemendaal were the defending champions. They defended their title by defeating Rot-Weiss Köln 4–0 in the final. Bloemendaal became the first club to successfully defend their Euro Hockey League title. Surbiton won the bronze medal by defeating Club de Campo 2–1 and became the first English club in 11 years to win an EHL medal.

Association team allocation
A total of 12 teams from 9 of the 45 EHF member associations would participate in the 2022 Euro Hockey League. The association ranking based on the EHL country coefficients was used to determine the number of participating teams for each association:
 Associations 1–3 each had two teams qualify.
 Associations 4–9 each had one team qualify.

Association ranking
For the 2022 Euro Hockey League, the associations are allocated places according to their 2020 EHL country coefficients, which takes into account their performance in European competitions from 2018–19 to 2020–21.

Teams
The labels in the parentheses show how each team qualified for the place of its starting round:
1st, 2nd, 3rd: League positions of the previous season
Abd-: League positions of the abandoned season due to the COVID-19 pandemic in Europe as determined by the national association.

Results
The draw took place on 30 November 2021. The schedule was released on 8 December 2021.

Bracket

Preliminary round
On 1 March 2022, following the Russian invasion of Ukraine, EHF excluded Russian and Belarusian clubs from all competitions.

Quarter-finals

Ranking matches

Semi-finals

Bronze medal match

Final

Top goalscorers

See also
 2022 Men's EuroHockey Club Trophy I
 2022 Men's EuroHockey Indoor Club Cup
 2022 Women's Euro Hockey League

References

External links

Euro Hockey League
2021–22 in European field hockey
April 2022 sports events in the Netherlands
2022 Euro Hockey League
2022 Euro Hockey League
2022 in Dutch sport
Euro Hockey League